Amadou Alassane (born 7 April 1983) is a French professional footballer who plays as a forward.

Career
Born in Le Havre, Alassane spent his whole professional career at Le Havre but did not break into the world of professional football until the age of 23. Before turning professional, he played as an amateur for AM Neiges in the lower leagues of French football.

Alassane began a one-week trial with Scottish side Celtic on 17 July 2009, with the view to signing on a permanent deal.

In July 2015, six years after retiring with a heart defect, Alassane went on trial with English National League side Kidderminster Harriers, appearing in their 2–0 victory over Romulus.

Early in 2019–20 season Alassana left Championnat National 3 club ESM Gonfreville to join league rivals FC Dieppe.

Career statistics

References

External links
 
 
 Amadou Alassane Interview

1983 births
Living people
French sportspeople of Mauritanian descent
French footballers
Footballers from Le Havre
Association football forwards
Le Havre AC players
ESM Gonfreville players
FC Dieppe players
Ligue 1 players
Ligue 2 players
Championnat National 3 players